Jugal Kishore (born 24 February 1959 Churai Purwa, Shivpuri, Lakhimpur Kheri (Uttar Pradesh)) is a politician from Bahujan Samaj Party and a Member of the Parliament of India representing Uttar Pradesh in the Rajya Sabha, the upper house of the Indian Parliament.

References

Bharatiya Janata Party politicians from Uttar Pradesh
Living people
Bahujan Samaj Party politicians from Uttar Pradesh
Rajya Sabha members from Uttar Pradesh
1959 births